Marriage in Poland may be performed as a civil or religious ceremony. The normal legal minimum age to marry is 18, however, women 16 or older may seek family court's permission to marry before turning 18 under exceptional circumstances. Same-sex marriage is not recognized in Poland and is forbidden by the Constitution of Poland.

References

External links

Poland
Law of Poland
Poland